The 2008–09 Top 14 Competition was a French domestic rugby union club competition operated by the Ligue Nationale de Rugby (LNR). It ran from late August 2008 through the final at Stade de France on June 6, 2009, in which Perpignan lifted the Bouclier de Brennus with a 22–13 win over Clermont.

This year's edition of the Top 14 welcomed Toulon, winners of the 2008 title in the second-level Pro D2, and Mont-de-Marsan, victors in the 2008 promotion playoffs between the second- through fifth-place teams in Pro D2. They took the place of Auch and Albi, relegated at the end of the 2007–08 Top 14. Auch, which had been promoted to the Top 14 for 2007–08, finished bottom of the table and went down. The other newly promoted team in 2007–08, Dax, finished second-from-bottom, but were reprieved when French sporting authorities forcibly relegated 12th-place Albi to Pro D2 due to financial issues.

Teams

Competition format
Each club plays every other club twice. The second half of the season is conducted in the same order as the first, with the club at home in the first half of the season away in the second. As in previous seasons, the top four clubs at the end of the home-and-away season advanced to a single-elimination playoff. The semifinals were held at neutral sites on May 29 and 30, with the final at Stade de France on June 6.

Going into the season, the top six clubs were guaranteed of berths in the 2009–10 Heineken Cup, with the possibility of a seventh if a French club had advanced further in the 2008–09 Heineken Cup than any team from England or Italy. However, the seventh French berth did not materialize this season, as the only Top 14 club to make the knockout stage, Toulouse, were eliminated in the quarterfinals, while England's Leicester Tigers reached the final (where they lost to Irish side Leinster). The sixth-place team would have been relegated to the 2009–10 European Challenge Cup if 11th-place Bourgoin had won the 2008–09 Challenge Cup final on 22 May; however, Bourgoin were defeated by English side Northampton Saints.

The bottom two teams are provisionally relegated to Pro D2, with the possibility of one or both of the bottom teams to be reprieved if a team above them fails a postseason financial audit (mandatory for all clubs in the league).

The LNR uses a slightly different bonus points system from that used in most other rugby competitions. It trialled a new system in 2007-08 explicitly designed to prevent a losing team from earning more than one bonus point in a match, a system that also makes it impossible for either team to earn a bonus point in a drawn match. LNR chose to continue with this system for 2008-09.

France's bonus point system operates as follows:

 4 points for a win.
 2 points for a draw.
 1 "bonus" point for winning while scoring at least 3 more tries than the opponent. This replaces the standard bonus point for scoring 4 tries regardless of the match result.
 1 "bonus" point for losing by 7 points (or less).

Season synopsis
While the four playoff teams—Perpignan, Toulouse, Clermont, and Stade Français—separated themselves from the pack fairly early in the season, it was Toulouse who were the form team in the first half of the season; they had a Top 14-record streak of 11 wins from Round 5 through Round 15. However, Perpignan surged in the second half of the season, finishing level with Toulouse on the season log; the Catalans claimed the top seed on the first tiebreaker of head-to-head competition points. Biarritz used a late-season surge to claim fifth place, while the final Heineken Cup berth was ultimately decided in the final round, when Brive's draw with Bourgoin combined with Bayonne's win over Stade Français without a bonus point left Brive and Bayonne level on the log; Brive won on the second tiebreaker of head-to-head scoring.

At the other end of the ladder, Mont-de-Marsan were rarely competitive and finished bottom. The second relegation place finally fell on Dax, after Bourgoin, Castres, and the highly ambitious Toulon spent time in relegation trouble.

For much of the season, Bourgoin faced another type of relegation trouble—financial. At the end of each season, all teams in both divisions of LNR must pass a financial audit conducted by DNACG (Direction nationale d'aide et de contrôle de gestion), LNR's financial arm, to be able to keep their professional licenses. The club were able to satisfy DNACG that they had sufficient financial guarantees to participate in Top 14 and were thus allowed to stay in the top flight.

 Second division: 2008–09 Rugby Pro D2 season

Table

Fixtures & Results

Round 1

Round 2

Round 3

Round 4

Round 5

Round 6

Round 7

Round 8

Round 9

Round 10

Round 11

Round 12

Round 13

Round 14

Round 15

Round 16

Round 17

Round 18

Round 19

Round 20

Round 21

Round 22

Round 23

Round 24

Round 25

Round 26

Knock-out stages

Semi-finals

Final

Leading scorers
 Note that points scorers includes tries as well as conversions, penalties and drop goals.

Top points scorers

Top try scorers

Attendances

 Attendances do not include the semi-finals or final as these are at neutral venues.

See also
 2008–09 Heineken Cup
 2008–09 Rugby Pro D2 season

Notes

References

  "Ligue Nationale de Rugby". lnr.fr. Accessed July 27, 2008.

External links
  Ligue Nationale de Rugby - Official website
 Top 14 on Planetrugby.com
 Top 14 - 2008/2009 on itsrugby.co.uk

Top 14 seasons
 
France